United Nations Security Council Resolution 356, adopted unanimously on August 12, 1974, after examining the application of  the Republic of Guinea-Bissau for membership in the United Nations, the Council recommended to the General Assembly that the Republic of Guinea-Bissau be admitted.

See also
 List of United Nations Security Council Resolutions 301 to 400 (1971–1976)

References
Text of the Resolution at undocs.org

External links
 

 0356
 0356
 0356
August 1974 events
1974 in Guinea-Bissau